Pavel Konstantinovich Kolchin (sometimes spelled Pavel Koltsjin; ; 9 January 1930 – 29 December 2010) was a Soviet cross-country skier who competed during the 1950s and 1960s, training at Dynamo in Moscow. He was born in Yaroslavl.

He competed in two Winter Olympics, earning a total of four medals. His wife, Alevtina Kolchina, was also an Olympic champion in cross-country skiing in 1964.

Kolchin also found success was at the FIS Nordic World Ski Championships, where he won three silver medals in 1958 (15 km, 30 km, and 4 x 10 km) and a bronze medal in 1962 (4 x 10 km).

Kolchin was awarded Order of the Red Banner of Labour (twice - in 1957 and 1972) and Order of the Badge of Honour (1970). For his successes at the Winter Olympics, the Nordic skiing World Championships and the Holmenkollen, Kolchin received the Holmenkollen medal in 1963 (Shared with his Alevtina Kolchina (his wife), Astrid Sandvik, and Torbjørn Yggeseth). Kolchin and Kolchina are the first husband and wife team to ever win the Holmenkollen Medal. Kolchin died on 29 December 2010.

References

 - click Holmenkollmedaljen for downloadable pdf file 
 - click Vinnere for downloadable pdf file 

1930 births
2010 deaths
Sportspeople from Yaroslavl
Communist Party of the Soviet Union members
Russian State University of Physical Education, Sport, Youth and Tourism, Department of Chess alumni
Cross-country skiers at the 1956 Winter Olympics
Cross-country skiers at the 1964 Winter Olympics
Dynamo sports society athletes
FIS Nordic World Ski Championships medalists in cross-country skiing
Holmenkollen medalists
Holmenkollen Ski Festival winners
Medalists at the 1956 Winter Olympics
Medalists at the 1964 Winter Olympics
Olympic bronze medalists for the Soviet Union
Olympic cross-country skiers of the Soviet Union
Olympic gold medalists for the Soviet Union
Olympic medalists in cross-country skiing
Honoured Masters of Sport of the USSR
Merited Coaches of the Soviet Union
Recipients of the Order of the Red Banner of Labour
Russian male cross-country skiers
Soviet male cross-country skiers